GGW may refer to:

 Girls Gone Wild (franchise), an adult entertainment company
 Glasgow station (Montana), a train station
 Glasgow Airport (Montana)
 Gogodala language